燒酒 or 燒酎 (literally: burned [distilled] liquor) is the name for several types of distilled beverages in East Asia. It may refer to:

 Shaojiu (/), more commonly known as Baijiu, a 56–130 proof Chinese liquor 
 Shōchū, a 40–70 proof Japanese liquor
 Soju (/), a 33.6–106 proof Korean liquor

See also 
 酒 (disambiguation)